Edwin Arthur Cook (9 July 1888 - 15 September 1972) was Archdeacon of Bath from 1947 to 1962.

Cook was educated at Maidstone Grammar School, Queens' College, Cambridge and Ridley Hall, Cambridge. After a curacy at Holy Trinity, Margate he was a CMS Missionary in Western China until 1926. After that he held incumbencies in Dover, Margate and Folkestone. He was Rector of Bath Abbey from 1947 to 1960.

Notes

1888 births
Alumni of Queens' College, Cambridge
People educated at Maidstone Grammar School
Archdeacons of Bath
Alumni of Ridley Hall, Cambridge
1972 deaths